Said Tarba (born 15 October 1968) is a former Georgian football player.

Personal life
His son Zaur Tarba is a professional footballer as well.

References

1968 births
People from Gudauta
Footballers from Abkhazia
Living people
Soviet footballers
FC Dinamo Sukhumi players
FC Dinamo Tbilisi players
Footballers from Georgia (country)
FC Zhemchuzhina Sochi players
Expatriate footballers from Georgia (country)
Expatriate footballers in Russia
Russian Premier League players
FC SKA Rostov-on-Don players
Association football defenders